Campo Lugar is a municipality located in the province of Cáceres Extremadura, Spain. According to the INE has a population of approx. 1108 inhabitants.

References

Municipalities in the Province of Cáceres